"The Freshest Boy" is a short story by American writer F. Scott Fitzgerald. It was first published in the July 28, 1928 issue of The Saturday Evening Post, and was reprinted in Fitzgerald's 1935 collection, Taps at Reveille.

Plot
The story centers around a boy and his discouragement while attending a preparatory school. The boy, Basil Duke Lee, is characterized as naive and dreamy. He is thus treated as an outcast among his peers as well as by the school's administrators.

Lee's naivete is contrasted with the experienced perspective of an upperclassman, Lewis Crum. Crum resents Lee's carefree nature and his lack of commitment to tradition. The two boys develop a competitive relationship, and it becomes clear that Lee is internally adjusted to the environment while outwardly aloof and unhappy. Unlike Lee, however, Crum comes from wealth, which gives him a palpable advantage at the school.

Lee is castigated by the school's headmaster over his low grades. As the story progresses, it becomes evident that Lee's family is not wealthy; he is one of the "poorest boys in a rich school." This causes him obvious shame, and the story's focus shifts to his hopes for an off–campus excursion to New York City. Instead he ventures out to a suburb and interacts with a boy who seems to have some type of emotional disability.

Escaping the stifling atmosphere of the school, Lee finally goes to New York City, and has lunch at the Manhattan Hotel; while there he reads a letter from his mother. The theme of homesickness is evident throughout the work. The letter informs Lee that he will be going abroad and will thus not be attending the school anymore. Initially, he is elated by the news.

The last section of the story takes place within the theater as Lee's thoughts turn to his future. He feels that, like actors following the course of a play, he has a destiny. Although he seeks to escape the turgid atmosphere of the preparatory school, he also believes that he must actualize his fate including college. After the play, the school official who accompanies him becomes intoxicated and falls asleep. When returning to the school, Lee is called a nickname  but he is not ashamed, nor mortified by the prospect of being an outcast any longer. He realizes that he is accepted, to the point where it will serve his needs, and falls asleep satisfied.

History
The story was written when Fitzgerald was arguably at the height of his creative powers. It is part of The Basil and Josephine Stories, and was composed during the period when he also was writing his novel Tender is the Night. Some of Basil Duke Lee's details resemble Fitzgerald's own including growing up in the Midwest. The story, like many which Fitzgerald wrote at the time, was well received by readers.

Collections
"The Freshest Boy" was reprinted in Fitzgerald's 1935 collection Taps at Reveille. It was also collected in The Basil and Josephine Stories, as well as Malcolm Cowley's The Stories of F. Scott Fitzgerald and in Matthew J. Bruccoli's The Short Stories of F. Scott Fitzgerald.

Reception
In The New York Times review of Taps at Reveille, critic Edith Walton wrote, "Poignant as well as amusing [is] the longer sequence of stories which deals with a pre-war boy in his middle teens. Though his method is different from Booth Tarkington's, Mr. Fitzgerald approaches at times the same startling veracity. Basil Duke Lee is a bright, sensitive, likeable boy, constantly betrayed by a fatal tendency to brag and boss. He knows his failing, especially after the minor hell of his first year at boarding school, but again and again he is impelled to ruin an initial good impression. Two of the Basil stories—'He Thinks He's Wonderful', and 'The Perfect Life'—are small masterpieces of humor and perception, and Mr. Fitzgerald is always miraculously adept at describing adolescent love affairs and adolescent swagger."

References

 The stories of F. Scott Fitzgerald: a selection of 28 stories FS Fitzgerald, M Cowley - 1951 - Scribner

External links
"The Freshest Boy," A Short Story by F. Scott Fitzgerald
F. Scott Fitzgerald Centenary: Matthew J. Bruccoli Collection at the University of South Carolina
The New York Times on Taps at Reveille

Short stories by F. Scott Fitzgerald
Works originally published in The Saturday Evening Post
1928 short stories
1920s short stories
American short stories